Magdalena Seda Loreto, better known as La Malena (Jerez de la Frontera, 1877 - Seville, 1956), was a gypsy flamenco dancer of Spain.

Artistic Career 
She developed almost all her artistic career  for more than fifty years in Seville. She was the niece of María La Chorrúa, who was her first teacher and expert in dancing alegrías. She was the one who taught her to move her arms and hands gracefully. La Malena started in her homeland and very soon her fame went beyond its limits, going to the singing cafés of that time.  

Her way of dancing was in the style of La Macarrona, who was her neighbor in Alameda de Hércules (Seville),and as her, she had a very similar career. La Malena began in the cafés-cantantes and ended up in the company of La Argentinita. In 1911 she made her first tour that took her to Russia, in the company of Maestro Realito. She received many praises, published in the Spanish press for more than two decades. During the 1940s she worked for Concha Piquer, and later she was the first dancer in the flamenco group for the Casino de la Exposición in Seville called "Malena y sus gitanas" (Malena and her gypsies).

Manuel Vallejo wrote about her:"La Malena meant and combined all the grace, all the charm and all the best style of an art learned and acquired by her with true devotion, she put all her soul and all her senses [...]."Despite her great success, the artist ended her days selling sweets in a street stall in the Alameda de Hércules, poor and forgotten.  

José Manuel Caballero Bonald also considered Malena to be among the greatest flamenco dancers of all time:"Malena's dancing, learned from that of Chorrúa, was like an unleashed vertigo of inspiration, like an electric jolt of the flesh. It is said that, at some moments, the dancer was subjected to a continuous syncope that was terrifying to watch"

Bibliography 

 Fernando el de Triana, Arte y artistas flamencos, Imprenta Helénica, Madrid, 1935 
El Imparcial (Madrid. 1867).Hemeroteca digital, BNE 20-4-1933 
Heraldo de Madrid. Hemeroteca digital, BNE, 20-5-1933

References

External links 

 B Web "Flamencas por derecho"
Flamenco dancers
Spanish dancers